The Supreme Electoral Council (CSE) is the public body responsible for organizing elections in Nicaragua. 

Roberto Rivas Reyes has been president of the CSE since July 2000, though as of January 2018, vice-president Lumberto Campbell functioned as acting head of the organization. Campbell was named to the Council by the National Assembly in 2014.

Previous presidents of the CSE include Mariano Fiallos Oyanguren (1984 to 1996)  and Rosa Marina Zelaya (beginning in the 1990s).

Past and current presidents

References

External links
Official website

Elections in Nicaragua
Nicaragua